Bestel is a German language surname. It stems from the male given name Sebastian – and may refer to:
Antoine Bestel (1766–1852), French lawyer and colonial politician
Zoë Bestel (1997), Scottish singer-songwriter

References 

German-language surnames
Surnames from given names